Pontibacillus salicampi is a Gram-positive, moderately halophilic and motile bacterium from the genus of Pontibacillus which has been isolated from soil from a saltern from Gomso in Korea.

References

 

Bacillaceae
Bacteria described in 2015